Dichostates quadrisignatus is a species of beetle in the family Cerambycidae. It was described by Hintz in 1912. It is known from the Democratic Republic of the Congo.

References

Crossotini
Beetles described in 1912
Endemic fauna of the Democratic Republic of the Congo